Amy Edwards is an Australian actor and singer, perhaps best known for playing Michelle Thomas on the Australian television series, All Saints on Channel 7 and for her roles in the musicals Priscilla, Queen of the Desert and The Lion King.

Biography

Early life 
Amy grew up on New South Wales’ Central Coast and began dance lessons at the age of seven, acting lessons at the age of nine and singing lesson when she was 11 years old.

Amy attended The McDonald College of Performing Arts in North Strathfield, New South Wales where she studied drama, music and dance.

In 2005, Amy starred in All Saints, playing 'Michelle Thomas', an abused prostitute, before going on to play a variety of roles, including Sarabi, in the Australian production of The Lion King.

Amy's next major role would come in 2009 when she appeared in the original West End production of Priscilla, Queen of the Desert. As the show's assistant dance captain and swing, she appeared as a Diva, Cynthia and Marion during her two-year run.

Filmography
2005: All Saints .... Michelle Thomas
2003: Comedy Inc. .... Various Characters

Notable performances
2011: Priscilla, Queen of the Desert .... Diva / Swing
2007: Human Nature Motown Tour ... Naturelle
2005: The Lion King ... Sarabi / Swing

References

External links

Amy Edwards Official website

Australian television actresses
Living people
Actresses from Sydney
Australian stage actresses
Year of birth missing (living people)
Musicians from Sydney